A headland is a point of land, usually high and often with a sheer drop, that extends out into a body of water.

Headland or Headlands can also refer to:
headLand, an Australian television series
Headland (agriculture), the area at each end of a planted field used for turning farm machinery
Headland, Alabama, a small city in the US
Headland, Hartlepool, a civil parish in County Durham, UK
Headlands Center for the Arts, in California, US
Headlands Beach State Park, in Ohio, US
Headlands, Zimbabwe, a village in the province of Manicaland, Zimbabwe
Headlands (constituency), a parliamentary constituency in Zimbabwe
The Headlands, a county park in Michigan

People
Des Headland (born 1981), Australian rules footballer
Isaac Taylor Headland (1859–1942), American sinologist
Leslye Headland (born 1980), American playwright, screenwriter, and director

See also 

 Headlander, 2016 video game